Jichang is a rural town in Shuicheng County, Guizhou Province, China. The town is located at the junction of Guizhou and Yunnan. The town is located on the southern Shuicheng County. It borders Xuanwei City in the north, Yingpan Miao, Yi and Bai Ethnic Township in the south, Faer Town in the east, and Panzhou in the west. Seven ethnic groups, including Han, Buyi, Yi, Miao, Gelao and Bai, live in the town, of which 11,812 are ethnic minorities, accounting for 41.47% of the total population.

History
In 2012, the former Jichang Buyi, Yi and Miao Ethnic Township was upgraded to a town.

On July 23, 2019, a landslide occurred in the town and 21 houses were buried.

Administrative division
The town is divided into 8 villages:
Pingdi
Shangying
Jingtou
Daba
Xiaoba
Qizhi
Ouzi
Anquan

Geography

Economy
The town is abound of minerals and water energy. Mineral resources are mainly coal, with a total reserves of about 700 million tons.

Walnut, ginger and kiwifruit are the main economic plants.

Attractions
The town famed across Guizhou for its severe karst peaks, such as Bingmashan, Yanfengdong, Tunshang Pingyandong.

References

Divisions of Shuicheng County